Three Colors: Blue (Bleu: Bande Originale Du Film) is the soundtrack album to the award-winning film Three Colors: Blue, with music composed by Zbigniew Preisner. The music is performed by the Sinfonia Varsovia (Beata Rybotycka, Elżbieta Towarnicka, Jacek Ostaszewski, Konrad Mastyło, Silesian Filharmonic Choir, Sinfonia Varsovia, Wojciech Michniewski - conductor).

Track listing 
 Song for the Unification of Europe (Patrice's Version) – 5:13
 Van Den Budenmayer-Funeral Music (Winds) – 2:02
 Julie-Glimpses of Burial – 0:30
 Reprise-First Appearance – 0:34
 The Battle of Carnival and Lent – 0:56
 Reprise-Julie with Olivier – 0:49
 Ellipsis 1 – 0:20
 First Flute – 0:50
 Julie-In Her New Apartment – 1:45
 Reprise-Julie on the Stairs – 1:05
 Second Flute – 1:16
 Ellipsis 2 – 0:20
 Van Den Budenmayer-Funeral Music (Organ) – 1:59
 Van Den Budenmayer-Funeral Music (Full Orchestra) – 1:47
 The Battle of Carnival and Lent II – 0:42
 Reprise-Flute (Closing Credits Version) – 2:19
 Ellipsis 3 – 0:22
 Olivier's Theme-Piano – 0:36
 Olivier & Julie-Trial Composition – 2:01
 Olivier's Theme-Finale – 1:38
 Bolero-Trailer For 'Red' Film – 1:08
 Song For The Unification Of Europe (Julie's Version) (Film) – 6:48
 Closing Credits – 2:04
 Reprise-Organ – 1:09
 Bolero-'Red' Film – 1:28

Other films in which these songs appear
"Reprise-Flute" appears during the haunting Triangle Shirtwaist fire scenes in Ric Burns' documentary film, New York.

Three Colors soundtracks 
 Three Colors: Blue (soundtrack)
 Three Colors: White (soundtrack)
 Three Colors: Red (soundtrack)

References

1993 soundtrack albums
Drama film soundtracks